Sri Maha Prathyangira Devi Temple is located in the area of Sholinganallur, Chennai, India, adjacent to the beach of Bay of Bengal. The Temple sits on the banks of the Buckingham Canal. This is a magnificent temple built for Goddess Prathyangira, in her incarnation of Shri Maha Prathyangira Devi. She is considered to be a powerful repellent of the influences generated by witchcraft, and is said to have the power to punish Adharma. This is one of the few temples of Prathyangira and the only temple for Shri Maha Prathyangira Devi, the Shanta form.

The Temple  

Other Gods who are also shrined in the renowned temple are Goddess Varahi, Goddess Neela Saraswathi, Lord Sarabheswara, Lord Ganesha, Lord Muruga, Lord Panjamukha Anjaneya, Lord Agni, Goddess Kaalikaambal, Lord Ayyapa, Lord Saniswara, Lord Narasimha, Lord Rahu and Ketu, Lord (Guruvayoorappan) and Lord Shiva.

Timing: 8 am - 12 pm and 4 pm - 7:45 pm on weekdays, 
Sunday from 8 am - 1 pm and 4 pm to 8:30 pm (Only on Ammavasai).

Poojas offered  

Abishegam and Archana are a regulation here. Special poojas are offered every Sundays.

Homas performed in the temple.
Homas are performed in the temple on special occasions only and it is conducted for free and any-one can participate, there is no agent or pre-booking for homam in this temple within India or in any other countries but there are scammers who pretend as agent for homams but they are no way related to this temple, homam are performed for public welfare and it is free to all.

Location 

The temple is located close to the junction and halfway down the link road of East Coast Road and Old Mahabalipuram Road.

References

External links
 Official website

Devi temples in India
Hindu temples in Chennai